Arkhip Ivanovich Kuindzhi or Arkhyp Kuindzhi (27 January 1841 – 24 July 1910) was a landscape painter from the Russian Empire of Pontic Greek descent from the area of Mariupol (modern-day East Ukraine). Kuindzhi was one of the best friends of Russian chemist Dmitry Mendeleev with whom he collaborated on color studies.

Date of birth
Kuindzhi's exact date of birth is not known. Although it was believed that he was born in 1842, the latest discoveries in archives suggest that he was born in 1841. Kuindzhi himself, when asked by St. Petersburg Academy of Arts to clarify his date of birth, "clearly wrote 1841, then, with doubt, January, and then several times crossed out the month".

The researchers believe he was born somewhere between January and March 1841. The commonly recognized date is January 27, although Kuindzhi celebrated his name day on February 19 O.S. (March 4 N.S.), on the feast of Archippus.

Biography
Arkhip Kuindzhi was born in Mariupolsky Uyezd (one of the subdivisions of the Yekaterinoslav Governorate of the Russian Empire) but spent his youth in the city of Taganrog. His Christian name is a Russian rendering of the Greek, Ἄρχιππος, (Archippos, from ἄρχος (archos) "master" and ἱππος (hippos) "horse": "master of horses"; cf. Colossians 4:17, Philemon 1:2) and his surname came from his grandfather's vocational nickname meaning 'goldsmith' in Crimean Tatar. He grew up in a poor family; his father was a Pontic Greek shoemaker, Ivan Khristoforovich Kuindzhi (elsewhere Emendzhi). Arkhip was six years old when he lost his parents, so he was forced to make a living working at a church building site, grazing domestic animals, and working at the corn merchant's shop. He received the rudiments of an education from a Greek friend of the family who was a teacher and then went to the local school.

In 1855, at age 13–14, Kuindzhi visited Feodosia to study art under Ivan Aivazovsky, however, he was engaged merely with mixing paints and instead studied with Adolf Fessler, Aivazovsky's student. A 1903 encyclopedic article stated: "Although Kuindzhi cannot be called a student of Aivazovsky, the latter had without doubt some influence on him in the first period of his activity; from whom he borrowed much in the manner of painting." English art historian John E. Bowlt wrote that "the elemental sense of light and form associated with Aivazovsky's sunsets, storms, and surging oceans permanently influenced the young Kuindzhi."

During the five years from 1860 to 1865, Arkhip Kuindzhi worked as a retoucher in the photography studio of Simeon Isakovich in Taganrog.  He tried to open his own photography studio, but without success. After that Kuindzhi left Taganrog for Saint Petersburg.

He studied painting mainly independently and at the St. Petersburg Academy of Arts (from 1868; a full member since 1893). He was co-partner of travelling art exhibitions (Peredvizhniki), a group of realist artists of Russian Empire who in protest to academic restrictions formed an artists' cooperative which evolved into the Society for Traveling Art Exhibitions (Peredvizhniki) in 1870.

In 1872 the artist left the academy and worked as a freelancer. The painting On the Valaam Island was the first artwork which Pavel Tretyakov acquired for his art gallery. In 1873 Kuindzhi exhibited his painting The Snow which received the bronze medal at the International Art Exhibition in London in 1874. In the middle of the 1870s he created a number of paintings in which the landscape motif was designed for concrete social associations in the spirit of Peredvizhniki (Forgotten Village, 1874; Chumatski Path, 1875; both – in the Tretyakov Gallery).

In his mature period Kuindzhy aspired to capture the most expressive illuminative aspect of the natural condition. He applied composite receptions (high horizon, etc.), creating panoramic views. Using light effects and intense colors shown in main tones, he depicted the illusion of illumination (Evening in Ukraine, 1876; The Birch Grove, 1879; After a Thunderstorm, 1879; all three are in the Tretyakov Gallery; Moonlit Night on the Dnieper, 1880 in the Russian Museum, St. Petersburg). His later works are remarkable for their decorative effects of color building.

Kuindzhi lectured at the St. Petersburg Academy of Arts (Professor since 1892; professor-head of landscape workshop since 1894; but was fired in 1897 for support of students' protests). Among his students were artists such as Arkady Rylov, Nicholas Roerich, Konstantin Bogaevsky, and others. Kuindzhi initiated the creation of the Society of Artists (1909; later – the Society was named after A.I. Kuindzhi).

Theft and potential destruction of work
In January 2019, his work Ai-Petri. Crimea was stolen from Moscow's Tretyakov Gallery, but was found and safely recovered the next day. The man who stole the painting was sentenced to three years in prison.

In March 2022, it was reported that the Kuindzhi Art Museum had been destroyed during the Russian invasion of Ukraine and the siege of Mariupol. The museum had housed three of Kuindzhi's works; Red Sunset, Elbrus and Autumn, which were believed to have been removed from the museum but not confirmed.

Tribute

On 27 January 2022, Google Doodle celebrated Arkhip Kuindzhi's 180th birthday.

Gallery

See also

 List of Russian artists

References

V.S. Manin Arkhip Ivanovich Kuinji, Leningrad, 1990,

External links
 Arkhip Ivanovich Kuindzhi (1842-1910)
 Kuindzhi - Artist of Light
 Collection — GTG

1841 births
1910 deaths
People from Mariupol
People from Yekaterinoslav Governorate
Russian people of Greek descent
Peredvizhniki
19th-century painters from the Russian Empire
Russian male painters
20th-century Russian painters
Russian landscape painters
Landscape artists
Imperial Academy of Arts alumni
Burials at Tikhvin Cemetery
19th-century male artists from the Russian Empire
Full Members of the Imperial Academy of Arts
19th-century Greek painters
20th-century Russian male artists
Artists from Taganrog